Denis Aleksandrovich Kondakov (born 29 June 1978) is a former Russian professional football player.

Club career
He played 4 seasons in the Russian Football National League for FC Avangard Kursk.

External links
 

Russian footballers
1978 births
Living people
Association football defenders
FC Avangard Kursk players